Robert Alaine (fl. ca. 1576) held an office under a nobleman in the time of Queen Elizabeth, and is now only known for an elaborate treatise, Alaine's Astronomy, on astronomical instruments, which is preserved in the library of Trinity College, Cambridge. It was given to the library by Sir Edward Stanhope.

References

British science writers
16th-century English astronomers
16th-century English writers
16th-century male writers
17th-century English writers
17th-century English male writers